The American Journal of Audiology is a peer-reviewed medical journal published biannually by the American Speech–Language–Hearing Association. It publishes articles related to clinical practice in audiology, including various clinical techniques, professional issues, and administration.

According to the Journal Citation Reports, the journal has a 2020 impact factor of 1.493.

References

External links
 

Publications established in 1991
Audiology journals
Biannual journals
English-language journals
Academic journals published by learned and professional societies of the United States
1991 establishments in the United States